Weatherman and Skin Goddess is a limited EP from singer-songwriter Robert Pollard. Only 1,000 CDs and 500 12 inch LPs were put into production and were made available exclusively on Pollard's website. Released on April 15, this marks the first release from Robert Pollard's record label Guided by Voices Inc.

The title track is featured on Robert Pollard Is Off to Business.

Track listing
 "Weatherman and Skin Goddess"
 "Kiss the Quiet Man"
 "Coat Factory Zero"

References
 Pollard Leaves Merge, Starts Label for New Album  (Pitchfork 2-18-2008)
 Rockathon Records

2008 EPs
Robert Pollard albums